Katemjan may refer to:
 Katemjan-e Yusefali
 Katemjan-e Motamedi
 Katemjan-e Seyyed Abd ol Vahhabi